Charles Malcolm McGillivray (10 July 1910 – 28 February 1983) was an Australian rules footballer who played with Hawthorn in the Victorian Football League (VFL).

McGillivray later served in the Australian Army for three years during World War II.

Notes

External links 

1910 births
1983 deaths
Australian rules footballers from Victoria (Australia)
Hawthorn Football Club players